Jon Springer (born in 1966) is an American independent filmmaker whose science fiction and horror films combine explicit imagery with religious subtext.

Biography 
Springer produced and directed The Hagstone Demon, a feature-length horror film starring indie-film icon Mark Borchardt (subject of the 1999 documentary American Movie), and underground cinema artist Lung Leg. The Hagstone Demon premiered at the 2009 TromaDance Film Festival in Park City, Utah and screened as a double-bill with American Movie (1999) at the Boston Museum of Fine Arts.

Springer's style has been criticized as derivative of directors Stanley Kubrick and George A. Romero.
Springer was called “a filmmaker who sees nothing as taboo” by Film Threat in 2002,  and named “most audacious filmmaker” in his native state of Minnesota in 2002.

Filmography

Notes

External links 
 

Living people
American film directors
1966 births